Juan Jacobo Fernandez (July 25, 1808, Moire, Ourense, Spain – July 9, 1860, Damascus, Syria) was a Franciscan friar of the convent of Herbón who was a martyr who achieved beatification.

He was martyred in Damascus when seven Spanish monks and an Austrian were assassinated on July 9, 1860, during an uprising by Turks and Druze against Christians. Fernandez was thrown from the tile roof of the church. Still alive, he fervently prayed to God that He would accept his sacrifice, until he was killed with a knife.

After their deaths, the names of Manuel Ruiz, Carmelo Volta, Nicanor Ascanio, Pedro Soler, Nicolás María Alberca, Francisco Pinazo and Juan Jacobo Fernández were beatified October 10, 1926 and are honoured yearly on 10 July.

References

External links
 Los Mártires de Damasco 

1808 births
1860 deaths
19th-century Roman Catholic martyrs
Spanish beatified people
Spanish people murdered abroad
People murdered in Syria